The Kirkfield Lift Lock is a boat lift located in the city of Kawartha Lakes, Ontario, Canada, near the village of Kirkfield. It is designated "Lock 36" of the Trent–Severn Waterway, situated at the highest section of the canal (256.2 m). It is Canada's second lift lock, the other one is the Peterborough Lift Lock, located on the same canal system.

Construction history

The early years

Construction of the lock took place between 1900 and 1907. It was contrived by Richard Birdsall Rogers, a Canadian engineer, who adopted the design of the Lifts on the old Canal du Centre in Belgium. The concept of the hydraulic lift lock had never been implemented in the harsher Canadian climate prior to the construction of the Peterborough Lift Lock, also designed by Rogers. The successful completion of the locks was therefore considered a significant technological breakthrough.

Modernization
During the late 1960s, the Kirkfield Lift Lock underwent a series of renovations. The original manual controls were electrified and automated, enabling all lock operations to be activated from a single console in the new control tower. The water-driven gate engines and pumps were removed, as well as the retaining walls, concrete piers, and the steel aqueduct. The shops and lockmaster's houses built along the canal were also demolished. The lock was reinforced with a massive concrete structure; a new two-lane underpass was constructed underneath.

Currently, the lock is used exclusively by pleasure boats, like the rest of the canal, becoming obsolete for commercial traffic after the present version of the Welland Canal was completed in 1932.

References

Transport infrastructure completed in 1907
Boat lifts
Locks of Canada
Canals in Ontario
National Historic Sites in Ontario
Buildings and structures in Kawartha Lakes
Transport buildings and structures in Ontario